The Cashuat is an armored personnel carrier produced in El Salvador, and based on the Dodge M37B1 ¾ ton (4×4) truck.

History
The first military vehicle ever produced in El Salvador, the Cashuat was designed by Salvadoran Army Colonel Oswaldo Marenco Carballo (1955 - ) in 1984, with a prototype being built and trialed in-country in February 1985.  During the trials, it was found that this particular prototype lacked sufficient ballistic protection, so the Salvadoran government sought assistance from the United States.  Seeing that El Salvador didn't have manufacturing facilities capable of building the number of vehicles required, the US Army Tank Automotive Command's RDE Center's Design and Manufacturing Technology Directorate proposed a three-step plan to produce the vehicles:

1. A second, improved prototype would be built in Detroit, and sent to El Salvador to serve as a reference model.
2. The armor would be cut and welded in the United States, pre-assembled with the windshields and side-rails, and shipped as kits to El Salvador.
3. Train a cadre of welders from El Salvador at facilities in the United States.

66 kits were provided for final assembly in El Salvador, one for each of the M37s in the Salvadoran Army's inventory.

See also
Astroboy armoured personnel carrier
Salvadoran Civil War
Thyssen Henschel UR-416
Weapons of the Salvadoran Civil War

References
Carlos Caballero Jurado and Nigel Thomas, Central American Wars 1959–89, Men-at-Arms series 221, Osprey Publishing Ltd, London 1990. 
Christopher F. Foss, Jane's Tank & Combat Vehicle recognition guide, HarperCollins Publishers, London 2002. 
David Spencer, Armoured Fighting Vehicles of El Salvador, Museum Ordnance Special Number 7 – English Edition, Darlington Productions, Inc., Mass Market Paperback, 1995. ASIN: B000LGYCHA
Julio Montes, Mexican and Central American Armor, Darlington Productions, Inc., 2001.

External links
VAL (light assault vehicle) Cashuat (El Salvador)
VAL Cashuat - Wheeled APC globalsecurity.org
Cashuat Tanks-Encyclopedia.com

Wheeled armoured personnel carriers
Armoured personnel carriers of the Cold War
Military of El Salvador
Dodge vehicles
Military vehicles introduced in the 1980s